Hippeutis is a genus of minute air-breathing freshwater snails, aquatic pulmonate gastropod mollusks or micromollusks in the family Planorbidae, the ramshorn snails.

Albrecht et al. (2007) have confirmed its placement in the tribe Segmentinini within subfamily Planorbinae.

Species
Species within the genus Hippeutis include:

Hippeutis acuticarinatus 
Hippeutis ambiguus 
Hippeutis badae 
Hippeutis bajandaicus 
Hippeutis bureaui 
Hippeutis cantori
???Hippeutis carntori 
Hippeutis chertieri 
Hippeutis complanatus  - type species of the genus Hippeutis
Hippeutis eysdenensis 
Hippeutis fasciatus 
Hippeutis headonensis 
Hippeutis inflatus 
Hippeutis langxiensis 
Hippeutis lens 
Hippeutis luminosa 
Hippeutis muzzolonicus 
Hippeutis obtusus 
Hippeutis patella 
Hippeutis rouvillei 
Hippeutis rouxi 
Hippeutis sowerbyi 
Hippeutis stossichi 
Hippeutis subfontanus 
Hippeutis ungeri 
Hippeutis vicentinus

References

External links 
 Hippeutis complanatus at AnimalBase

Planorbidae

no:Flatskivesnegl